Jawad El Yamiq (born 29 February 1992) is a Moroccan professional footballer who plays as a centre-back for La Liga club Real Valladolid and the Morocco national team.

Club career
In the 2014–15 Botola, El Yamiq's Olympique Khouribga finished as runners-up to Wydad AC and won the Moroccan Throne Cup by beating FUS Rabat in the final.

Raja CA 
In  the summer of 2016, 25-year-old El Yamiq signed a contract with Raja Casablanca for four years. He scored his first goal for the team in a 5–1 victory against Chabab Atlas Khénifra. He won the 2017 Throne cup against Difaâ Hassani El Jadidi.

Europe 
On 28 January 2018, Jawad signed with the Italian team Genoa. He was loaned to Serie B team Perugia Calcio. On 29 January 2020, he joined Zaragoza on loan until the end of the 2019–20 season. He made his first appearance for the team against Cádiz.

On 24 September 2020, he signed a four-year contract with Real Valladolid. He made his debut against Real Madrid. On 31 November 2021, El Yamiq scored his first goal for the club in a 2-0 victory against SD Eibar.

International career
El Yamiq represented Morocco in the 2018 African Nations Championship, helping his country to achieve the first chan title for Morocco.

On 10 November 2022, he was named in Morocco's 26-man squad for the 2022 FIFA World Cup in Qatar.

Career statistics
Scores and results list Morocco's goal tally first, score column indicates score after each El Yamiq goal.

Honors
Olympique Khouribga 
Coupe du Trône: 2015

Raja CA
Coupe du Trône: 2017

Morocco
African Nations Championship: 2018

References

External links
 
 
 
 

Living people
1992 births
People from Khouribga
Association football central defenders
Moroccan footballers
Olympique Club de Khouribga players
Raja CA players
Genoa C.F.C. players
A.C. Perugia Calcio players
Real Zaragoza players
Real Valladolid players
Botola players
Serie A players
La Liga players
Segunda División players
2022 FIFA World Cup players
Morocco international footballers
Moroccan expatriate footballers
Expatriate footballers in Italy
Expatriate footballers in Spain
21st-century Moroccan people
2016 African Nations Championship players
Morocco A' international footballers
2018 African Nations Championship players